The Himalayan cutia (Cutia nipalensis) is a bird species in the family Leiothrichidae. Its scientific name ultimately means "the khutya from Nepal", as Cutia is derived from the Nepali name for these birds, and nipalensis is Latin for "from Nepal".

This species inhabits the Himalayan region, from India to northern Thailand. A subspecies also occurs in Peninsular Malaysia. Previously the genus Cutia was monotypic, but the Vietnamese cutia, for long lumped with the Himalayan birds as a subspecies, has been recently raised to full species status as C. legalleni.

Its natural habitats are tropical to subtropical humid montane forests. It is not a bird of the high mountains, however, rather inhabiting broadleaf forest – e.g. of oaks (Quercus) – of the foothills upwards of 1,500 m  ASL or so, but rarely if ever ascending above 2,500 m ASL.

The Himalayan cutia is not considered threatened by the IUCN, retaining its pre-split status as a Species of Least Concern; in Bhutan, for example, it is a fairly frequently seen resident.

Gallery

Footnotes

References
 BirdLife International (BLI) (2008a) Himalayan Cutia Species Factsheet. Retrieved 2008-MAY-27.
 BirdLife International (BLI) (2008b): [2008 IUCN Redlist status changes]. Retrieved 2008-MAY-23.
 Collar, N.J. & Robson, Craig (2007): Family Timaliidae (Babblers). In: del Hoyo, Josep; Elliott, Andrew & Christie, D.A. (eds.): Handbook of Birds of the World, Volume 12 (Picathartes to Tits and Chickadees): 70-291. Lynx Edicions, Barcelona.
 Inskipp, Carol; Inskipp, Tim & Sherub (2000): The ornithological importance of Thrumshingla National Park, Bhutan. Forktail 14: 147–162. PDF fulltext
 International Union for the Conservation of Nature and Natural Resources (IUCN) (2007): 2007 IUCN Red List of Threatened Species. IUCN, Gland.
 Pittie, Aasheesh (2004): A dictionary of scientific bird names originating from the Indian region. Buceros: ENVIS Newsletter Avian Ecology & Inland Wetlands 9(2): 1-30. PDF fulltext

Himalayan cutia
Himalayan cutia
Birds of Bhutan
Birds of the Himalayas
Birds of Nepal
Birds of Northeast India
Birds of Laos
Birds of Myanmar
Himalayan cutia